Eurotherium ("european beast") is an extinct paraphyletic genus of hyaenodontid mammals from family Hyaenodontidae that lived during the early to middle Eocene in Europe.

Phylogeny
The phylogenetic relationships of genus Eurotherium are shown in the following cladogram.

See also
 Mammal classification
 Hyaenodontidae

References

Hyaenodonts
Eocene mammals
Prehistoric placental genera